Robert Anthony Orsi (born 1953) is a scholar of American history and Catholic studies who is the Grace Craddock Nagle Chair professor at Northwestern University. Before coming to Northwestern, Orsi chaired the department of religious studies at Harvard University.

Life
Orsi was born and raised in the Bronx borough of New York City. He majored in religion and sociology at Trinity College (CT) and graduated salutatorian in 1975, receiving both a Danforth and Watson Scholarship. He attended graduate school in religion at Yale University where his prize-winning dissertation formed the basis of his first book, The Madonna of 115th Street.  He taught at Fordham University at Lincoln Center from 1981 to 1988, at Indiana University from 1988 to 2001, and Harvard University/Harvard Divinity School from 2001 to 2007. He currently teaches at Northwestern University.

He is the editor of The Cambridge Companion to Religious Studies (2011) and the author of History and Presence (2016).

He is also Grace Craddock Nagle Chair of Catholic Studies and Professor of Religious Studies, History, and American Studies and Faculty Fellow (2020-2021) at the University of Notre Dame.

Awards
 2000 Guggenheim Fellowship
 1999 National Endowment for the Humanities Fellowship 
 Fulbright Fellowship
 John Gilmary Shea Prize from the American Catholic Historical Association, for The Madonna of 115th Street
 Jesuit National Book Award, for  The Madonna of 115th Street
 Merle Curti Award in American Social History from the Organization of American Historians, for Thank You, Saint Jude
 Award for Excellence in the Study of Religion from the American Academy of Religion, for Between Heaven and Earth

Works
"When 2+2=5", The American Scholar, Spring 2007
History and Presence. The Belknap Press of Harvard University Press. 2016. .
 
    (1st edition 1985; 2nd edition 2002),

Edited

References

American historians of religion
Northwestern University faculty
Living people
Presidents of the American Academy of Religion
1953 births
University of Notre Dame faculty